Märchenbilder or Fairy Tale Pictures, for Piano and Viola, Op. 113, was written by Robert Schumann in March 1851. The work is dedicated to the German violinist and conductor Wilhelm Joseph von Wasielewski. It consists of four character pieces and is an original composition featuring the viola from the Romantic period.

Schumann gives us few clues as to what creatures or events are depicted within each movement. His 1853 composition Märchenerzählungen for clarinet, viola and piano also leaves the details to the imagination of the performers and the audience.

Movements 
 Nicht schnell (Not Fast) in D minor
 Lebhaft (Lively) in F major
 Rasch (Quick) in D minor
 Langsam, mit melancholischem Ausdruck (Slowly, with Melancholic Expression) in D major

Sources
 Margit L. McCorkle, Robert Schumann. Thematisch-Bibliographisches Werkverzeichnis, München-Mainz 2003, p. 160
 Klaus Martin Kopitz & Torsten Oltrogge, Ein Dichter namens Louis du Rieux und Schumanns „Märchenbilder“ op. 113. Annäherungen an einen geheimnisvollen Verehrer des Komponisten, in: Denkströme. Journal der Sächsischen Akademie der Wissenschaften, no. 11 (2013), p. 112–140 PDF

External links 
 
Performance of Märchenbilder by Paul Neubauer (viola) and Anne-Marie McDermott (piano) from the Isabella Stewart Gardner Museum in MP3 format
 Background and Ideas for Interpretations by Zsuzsanna Lipták-Pikó, Masters Thesis

1851 compositions
Chamber music by Robert Schumann
Compositions for viola
Compositions in D minor
Music based on fairy tales